Las Malvinas/Echarate Airport  is an airport serving the Las Malvinas natural gas plant in the Cusco Region of Peru. The runway is adjacent to the plant, and is the primary transport access to it. No towns are near the plant, which is on the Urubamba River. The plant processes natural gas from the Camisea gas fields and sends it along two pipelines for export and domestic use.

The Malvinas VOR-DME (Ident: MLV) and non-directional beacon (Ident MLV) are located on the field.

See also
Transport in Peru
List of airports in Peru

References

External links
OpenStreetMap - Las Malvinas
OurAirports - Las Malvinas
SkyVector - Las Malvinas

Airports in Peru
Buildings and structures in Cusco Region